Alpha S. Diallo (born June 29, 1997) is an American professional basketball player for AS Monaco of the French LNB Pro A and the EuroLeague. He played college basketball for the Providence Friars.

High school career
Diallo was born and grew up in New York City but moved to Denver, Colorado with his mother. He played at Denver West High School as a sophomore and led the team to the Sweet 16 in the Class 4A tournament. He was declared ineligible by the Colorado High School Activities Association after attempting to transfer to Abraham Lincoln High School, coached by his mentor Vince Valdez. Diallo played two seasons at Frederick Douglass Academy in Harlem. He did a postgraduate year at Brewster Academy and averaged 16.5 points and 6.5 rebounds per game. He scored 35 points and had eight rebounds and eight assists against eventual national champion Hargrave Military Academy. Diallo represented Team Africa in the adidas Nations circuit and averaged 20.5 points and 10.7 rebounds per game. Diallo was ranked the 95th best player in his class and signed with Providence after Junior Lomomba's transfer opened up a scholarship. He chose the Friars over offers from Oklahoma State and VCU.

College career
As a freshman, Diallo averaged 5.7 points and 3.2 rebounds per game. Diallo averaged 13.2 points, 6.6 rebounds, and 2.3 assists per game as a sophomore and often defended the opposing team's best player. However, he only shot 21 percent from three-point range, and worked on his shooting in the summer. As a junior, Diallo was named to the Second Team All-Big East. He averaged 16 points, 8.1 rebounds, 3.1 assists, and 1.6 steals per game, leading the team in all four categories. Diallo declared for the 2019 NBA draft but decided to return to Providence. Coming into his senior season, he was named to the Preseason First Team All-Big East. On February 16, 2020, Diallo scored a career-high 35 points in a 74–71 upset of tenth-ranked Seton Hall, shooting 11-of-15 from the floor. He was named Big East Player of the Week on February 17. As a senior, Diallo averaged 14.1 points and 7.8 rebounds per game and was a repeat selection to the Second Team All-Big East.

Professional career

Lavrio 
On September 9, 2020, Diallo signed his first professional contract with Lavrio of the Greek Basket League. During the very successful 2020–2021 campaign, where the club reached the Greek Basket League finals for the first time, Diallo averaged 12.9 points, 5.4 rebounds, 2 assists, and 1.5 steals per game.

Monaco 
On July 24, 2021, Diallo officially signed a three-year contract with Greek Basket League champions and EuroLeague mainstays Panathinaikos. However, on August 30, 2021, he signed with AS Monaco of the French LNB Pro A.

On May 18, 2022, he was named to the All-LNB Pro A First Team. Diallo helped Monaco reach the Finals of the Pro A, where they lost to LDLC ASVEL.

National team career
In the summer of 2019, Diallo was a part of the United States National team who competed at the Pan American Games in Peru. The team won bronze, defeating Dominican Republic 92–83 with 23 points and five rebounds from Diallo. Diallo led the team in scoring (15.0), rebounding (5.6) and steals (1.6) per game.

Career statistics

College

|-
| style="text-align:left;"| 2016–17
| style="text-align:left;"| Providence
| 33 || 16 || 21.4 || .407 || .243 || .738 || 3.2 || 1.2 || .9 || .2 || 5.7
|-
| style="text-align:left;"| 2017–18
| style="text-align:left;"| Providence
| 32 || 31 || 30.7 || .466 || .214 || .733 || 6.6 || 2.3 || 1.0 || .3 || 13.2
|-
| style="text-align:left;"| 2018–19
| style="text-align:left;"| Providence
| 34 || 34 || 35.4 || .420 || .333 || .674 || 8.1 || 3.1 || 1.6 || .5 || 16.0
|-
| style="text-align:left;"| 2019–20
| style="text-align:left;"| Providence
| 31 || 30 || 32.7 || .414 || .313 || .632 || 7.8 || 2.5 || 1.5 || .9 || 14.1
|- class="sortbottom"
| style="text-align:center;" colspan="2"| Career
| 130 || 111 || 30.0 || .429 || .291 || .684 || 6.4 || 2.3 || 1.3 || .5 || 12.2

Personal life 
Diallo's brother, Mohamed "Mo" Diallo, currently plays for Stony Brook.

References

External links
Providence Friars bio

1997 births
Living people
American men's basketball players
AS Monaco Basket players
Basketball players at the 2019 Pan American Games
Basketball players from Denver
Basketball players from New York City
Brewster Academy alumni
Lavrio B.C. players
Medalists at the 2019 Pan American Games
Pan American Games bronze medalists for the United States
Pan American Games medalists in basketball
People from Harlem
Providence Friars men's basketball players
Small forwards
Sportspeople from Manhattan
United States men's national basketball team players